Le Plantay is a commune in the Ain department in eastern France.

Population

Sights
The Abbey of Notre-Dame des Dombes, founded by Trappist monks in 1863, is located in the commune.

See also
Communes of the Ain department

References

External links

la Dombes and the city of Le Plantay

Communes of Ain
Ain communes articles needing translation from French Wikipedia